The Church of Saint Mary in Morović is a Roman Catholic church in Vojvodina, Serbia. The church was built in XII-XIII century period, later extended, and at the end of the XIX century restored. The Gothic nave with a bell tower was added to the original Romanesque church in the 14th century. During the Middle Ages the church was a seat of the Roman Catholic Archdiocese of Morović that was first mentioned in 1239. It was created as an answer to the spread of the Bogomilism of the Bosnian Church. The Archdiocese reached its peak around 1330 when it had about forty local parishes under its jurisdiction. On 1 May 1414 Pope John XXII decorated the rector of the church in Morović and his successors with the title of praepositus and gave him wide jurisdiction over rectors of other churches in the region and exempted him from the authority of the Bishop of Pécs. The Ottoman Empire conquered Morović in 1529 and controlled it up until 1687. The church was burned down by the Ottoman forces in 1664, remained uncovered for 40 years, and was restored only in 1704. Autonomous Province of Vojvodina protected the building as a historical monument on 5 February 1954. Conservation works were carried out in the period of the Socialist Republic of Serbia between 1968 and 1972.

See also
 Catholic Church in Serbia
 Croats of Serbia

References

Romanesque architecture in Serbia
Gothic architecture in Serbia
Roman Catholic churches in Vojvodina